The 1994 Brickyard 400 was held on Saturday, August 6, 1994, at the Indianapolis Motor Speedway. The race marked the nineteenth race of the 1994 NASCAR Winston Cup Series season. It was the first NASCAR stock car race at the famous Speedway and the first race of any kind held at the track beside the Indianapolis 500 since the Harvest Classic in 1916. The race featured the largest crowd in NASCAR history, and a then NASCAR record purse of $3.2 million.

Second-year driver, 23-year-old Jeff Gordon, who once lived in nearby Pittsboro, was cheered on by the hometown crowd to a popular win. It was his second career NASCAR Winston Cup win and thrust the young Gordon, the future hall of famer, into superstardom.

The race was a culmination of decades of speculation and over two years of preparation. While the event was looked on with enormous anticipation and significant media attention, the traditional nature of the Indianapolis 500 and the Speedway was a concern to ownership, some from the Indycar community, and some fans. Despite some mild complaints, the event was considered a huge success and a financial cash cow—it ultimately bankrolled the formation of the Indy Racing League. The race featured two former Indy 500 winners (A. J. Foyt and Danny Sullivan). Foyt came out of retirement to participate, which would be his final Winston Cup start.

Background

The Indianapolis Motor Speedway opened in 1909, and the first Indianapolis 500 was held in 1911. It became a tradition that the Indianapolis 500 was the only race held at the track annually. With the exception of a September race meet in 1916, no other races were held at the track through 1993. As the NASCAR Winston Cup Series began to grow in stature and popularity, speculation began to grow in the 1980s and early 1990s about the possibility of holding a race at Indy.

On September 24, 1991, A. J. Foyt filmed a commercial for Craftsman tools at the Indianapolis Motor Speedway. While filming in the garage area, Foyt, and Speedway president Tony George decided to take Foyt's NASCAR Winston Cup Series stock car for a few laps around the track. Foyt was the first driver to do so, and later on, George himself took a few laps. The event was not planned, and had no implications, but was an unusual sight, and stirred up some mild interest and speculation for the future.

In December 1991, the Indianapolis Motor Speedway board  of directors voted to pursue a second race at the Speedway, preferably a NASCAR Winston Cup event. In March 1992, IROC was invited to test cars at the Speedway. On June 22–23, 1992, nine top NASCAR Winston Cup series teams were invited to test at Indy. Although no official announcements were made, it was in fact an unofficial compatibility test to see if stock cars would be competitive at the circuit. An estimated 10,000 spectators watched two days of history in the making.

On April 14, 1993, Speedway President Tony George and president of NASCAR Bill France Jr. jointly announced the inaugural Brickyard 400 would be held Saturday, August 6, 1994. A new race logo was also unveiled. Immediately, anticipation for the event grew, as many drivers contemplated one-off entries, and comparisons were already being made to NASCAR's biggest event, the Daytona 500. ABC signed on to broadcast the race live, and ESPN would cover practice and qualifying.

1994 season
Jimmy Spencer won the DieHard 500 at Talladega, immediately preceding the 1994 Brickyard 400. Going into the race, the top five in championship points were as follows:

NASCAR "tire war" was notable during the 1994 season. Both Goodyear and Hoosier tires were used by entrants. Many of the front-runners utilized Goodyear. Among the top teams using Hoosier tires was Geoff Bodine.

In order to attract more entries, the initial Brickyard 400 was concurrently included in the NASCAR Winston West schedule. One provisional starting position would be available to the top driver in Winston West points that did not qualify on speed. The points leader in Winston West standings entering the race was Mike Chase.

Going into the race, conjecture amongst fans and media contemplated the possibility of an expanded field, a special qualifying format, a three-abreast starting grid, a celebrity pace car driver, or other changes for the race. However, NASCAR officials planned on treating the Brickyard 400 as any other points-paying race, with standard rules and regulations.

Tire tests

1992 test
On June 22–23, 1992, nine top NASCAR Winston Cup series teams were invited to Indy to participate in a Goodyear tire test. Over the weekend, the teams had raced in the Miller Genuine Draft 400 at Michigan International Speedway. Although no official announcements were made, it was in fact an unofficial feasibility test to see if stock cars would be competitive at the circuit. An estimated 20,000-25,000 spectators watched a rather exciting two days of history in the making. A. J. Foyt took a few laps around the track in Dale Earnhardt's car on the second day. ESPN covered the test.

1993 open test
On August 16–17, 1993, thirty-five NASCAR teams took part in an official open test at Indy. It was held as the teams returned from the second race at Michigan, the Champion Spark Plug 400. The top 35 teams in NASCAR points received invitations. Hosting the test in August mimicked the weather conditions expected for the race in 1994. Several thousand spectators attended, and many announcements were made.

Bobby Labonte set the fastest lap on Monday, while Bill Elliott turned the fastest lap overall on Tuesday morning. On Monday, Kenny Wallace spun out and hit the inside wall. He was taken to Methodist Hospital for minor injuries. At noon on Tuesday, recently retired NASCAR legend Richard Petty took four fast laps by himself and then donated his car to the Speedway museum. Later on Tuesday, during a session of "drafting practice," a full complement of over 30 cars took to the track, to simulate race condition. John Andretti spun in turn 1, and several cars crashed. No injuries were reported, but the incident drew the ire of some of the veterans who thought some drivers were pushing too hard. ESPN covered the test, airing highlights of both days on SpeedWeek.

Some of the participants compared the Indianapolis Motor Speedway to Ontario Motor Speedway, which was built to closely mimic Indy's layout. Only a handful of drivers in the field had actually driven at Ontario before it closed (1980), and none of them felt they held any sort of measurable experience advantage.

1994 testing
During the summer of 1994, private testing sessions conducted by the manufacturers were held. A. J. Foyt came out of retirement, shaking down and testing the #50 Ford.

Chevrolet and Pontiac's teams took to the track in mid-July. Danny Sullivan blew an engine.

Entry list
86 cars attempted to make the inaugural Brickyard 400 which is a NASCAR record.

 (R) denotes rookie driver.

Pole qualifying

Pole qualifying for the Inaugural Brickyard 400 was held on Thursday, August 4, 1994. A NASCAR record 86 cars entered, for 43 starting positions. H. B. Bailey drew the #1 qualifying attempt. Per the NASCAR rules in 1994, a one-lap qualifying attempt was utilized. The top twenty cars in pole qualifying were locked into the starting field. The remainder of the cars could stand on their time, or make a new attempt in second-round qualifying.

The first practice was held Thursday morning. Four incidents occurred, crashes by Joe Nemechek, Robert Pressley, Tim Steele, and Dale Jarrett brushed the wall. Nemechek, Pressley, and Steele would switch to back-up cars, while Jarrett's car was not seriously damaged. The practice session was followed by a heavy thunderstorm that pelted the Speedway. The rain stopped and the track dried, allowing qualifying to start on time at 3 p.m.

The entire qualifying line of 70 attempts was completed without a single incident. H. B. Bailey went into the record books as the first stock car to complete a qualifying attempt. His speed of 152.669 mph was a stock car track record for only a minute or two, and his speed proved to be the slowest of the day other than those that experienced mechanical problems. Only two drivers experienced trouble, one was Ken Schrader, who blew an engine during his attempt. The very next car out to qualify was Rick Mast. Jeff Gordon was one of the last cars to make an attempt, and qualified third. Geoff Bodine and Bobby Labonte round out the top five.

Indy car and IMSA regular Geoff Brabham, attempting his first NASCAR race, surprised many by qualifying 18th. Former Indy 500 winners A. J. Foyt and Danny Sullivan, however, did not make the top twenty. Wally Dallenbach Jr. driving for Petty Enterprises, who drew 84th out of the 85 cars in line, pulled in when he felt something was wrong with the engine and ended the day with no speed. Rookie Joe Nemechek, who wrecked his primary car in the morning practice session, bounced back with the 21st-fastest qualifying speed; a speed strong enough that he would stand on his time and ultimately qualify for the race.

Pole qualifying results

Second round qualifying

Second-round qualifying was held Friday August 5, 1994. The drivers that had qualified 1st–20th on Thursday were locked-in to those positions and did not have to re-qualify. The drivers that placed 21st and beyond from the previous round were allowed to stand on their time from Thursday, or erase it and make a new attempt. Due to the expected length of the session, and the sensitive nature of how the track is known to react to changing weather conditions, for fairness, the qualifying draw order from the previous round was inverted for round two. NASCAR subsequently adopted this policy for all races from that day forth until two-round qualifying was abolished at the end of the 2000 season.

Five drivers stood on their times from Thursday, and all five hung on to qualify for the race. Terry Labonte, who had placed 26th Thursday, was among those who elected to re-qualify, and he wound up the fastest qualifier of the day. The decision was wise as Labonte's Thursday speed would not have help up Friday. A. J. Foyt managed to qualify in 40th, the last car to make the field on speed. After a miserable run on Thursday, Kyle Petty found much-needed speed and placed 36th. Lake Speed (168.429 mph) and Harry Gant (168.003 mph) both failed to crack the top 40, but made the field as the provisional starters – the two highest-placed entries in NASCAR points standing not already in the race. No Winston West Series competitors made the field on speed, but Mike Chase (166.312 mph) was awarded a special provisional for the highest entry in Winston West points standings (Chase was the Winston West points leader going into the race).

Very few of the one-off entries by Indy car regulars made the field. Danny Sullivan surprised himself by placing 26th for his first (and only) career Winston Cup start. Popular Indy car owner Dick Simon who was noted for never failing to qualify one of his rookie drivers at the Indy 500 fell short as his driver, NASCAR veteran Jim Sauter, ranked only 47th. After no major incidents during qualifying attempts on Thursday, Friday's qualifying saw wrecks or spins by four cars, including Daytona 500 polesitter Loy Allen Jr. Dick Trickle had a fast lap going until lightly brushing the wall coming off of turn four. He would miss the field by 0.037 seconds.

Among the drivers who chose not to make a qualifying attempt in the second round session was Ben Hess, who had been injured in an accident during a practice session earlier in the day. H. B. Bailey, who had drawn the first spot in the qualifying order Thursday was, per the inverted order, the final car to make a qualifying attempt on Friday. Bailey closed out time trials, gaining over 8 mph from his previous speed, but still fell far short of making the starting lineup.

*Stood on Thursday time

Qualifying notes
A trio of brothers - Geoff, Brett, and Todd Bodine made the field, a feat that had only been accomplished once in the history of the Indy 500. In 1982, Don, Bill, and Dale Whittington all qualified for the 500. Another trio of brothers nearly did the same as Rusty and Kenny Wallace qualified, but Mike Wallace ranked only 55th. P. J. Jones, son of 1963 Indianapolis 500 winner Parnelli Jones, and the only driver entered who was a son of a former Indy 500 winner, did not complete a qualifying attempt.

Future Hall of Fame drivers Davey Allison, Alan Kulwicki, and future Hall of Fame nominee Neil Bonnett had all been notably killed in the time between the initial tire tests in 1992–1993 and the running of the race. Allison was the only one of the three that had participated in one of the early tire tests, taking part in June 1992. Neil Bonnett, who entered but did not qualify for the 1979 Indianapolis 500, announced plans to enter the 1994 Brickyard 400. However, he was fatally injured in a crash at Daytona on February 11, 1994, five months before the Brickyard 400 was held. Kulwicki and Allison both died in aviation accidents in 1993. Geoff Bodine bought Kulwicki's team, Allison was eventually replaced by Ernie Irvan, and Bonnett was replaced by Jeff Purvis. All three of those entries qualified for the race.

Race summary

Pre-race

Popular Indianapolis 500 fixture Jim Nabors was invited to sing the national anthem, accompanied by the Indiana State University Marching Sycamores. Mary F. Hulman gave the traditional starting command. Elmo Langley drove the Chevrolet Monte Carlo pace car, and Doyle Ford served as flagman. The flyover was performed by the 181st Fighter Group, featuring four F-16 fighter jets.

All living former NASCAR Winston Cup Champions were invited to participate in a pre-race parade around the track. Besides the former champions who qualified for the race (Earnhardt, Wallace, Elliott, Waltrip, and Labonte), those in attendance included Richard Petty, Rex White, Buck Baker, Ned Jarrett, and Benny Parsons. Former Daytona 500 winner Buddy Baker was also in attendance.

After the final practice session Friday evening, polesitter Rick Mast, as well as Ernie Irvan and Brett Bodine, were among the teams that changed the engines in their cars.

Start
At the start, polesitter Rick Mast led Dale Earnhardt into turn one. In turn four, Earnhardt brushed the wall, which allowed Mast to lead the first lap. Earnhardt quickly began to slip in the standings. Meanwhile, Jeff Gordon passed Mast to take over the lead. On lap 3, Danny Sullivan lost a side window, bringing out the caution for debris. Earnhardt pitted to check the damage and fell to the rear of the field.

The green came back out on lap 6. On lap 10, Jimmy Spencer lost control and crashed hard in turn 3. He would become the first driver to drop out.

First half

The first half settled into a comfortable pace, with Jeff Gordon leading for several segments. The top five were battled among drivers including Gordon, Geoff Bodine, Bill Elliott, Darrell Waltrip, and Brett Bodine. Dale Earnhardt attempted to charge through the field and managed to lead laps during a sequence of green-flag pit stops.

A. J. Foyt ran out of fuel on lap 46. He attempted to stay out and lead a lap during green-flag pit stops, but had to coast around a full lap, and lost several laps in the process. He made it back to the pits and re-joined the race.

Second half

On lap 95, Mike Chase and Dave Marcis crashed in turn 2, bringing out the caution. Under the yellow, Brett Bodine took on only two tires, which allowed him to re-enter the track with the lead. The field lined up for the restart with brothers Brett and Geoff Bodine first and second, respectively. Brett got the jump and led down the backstretch on lap 100. In turn three, Geoff nudged Brett's rear bumper, which caused Brett to become loose, and Geoff took the lead. In turn 4, however, Brett bumped Geoff in the rear bumper and spun him out in front of the entire field. Geoff hit the outside wall and collected Dale Jarrett. Other cars scrambled to avoid the crash, most of which emerged with only minor damage. After the crash, Geoff suggested Brett spun him out on purpose, attributing the move to "family problems" between the brothers. Brett later admitted he spun Geoff out on purpose, and the brothers feuded for nearly two years afterward.

With Geoff Bodine out, the race came down to a battle between Jeff Gordon and Ernie Irvan, with Brett Bodine holding on to a strong top-five position.

On lap 130, Geoff Brabham got high in turn 1 and hit the outside wall. Jimmy Hensley swerved to avoid him, but Brabham spun and smacked into the side of Hensley's car. Brabham was out of the race, but Hensley limped back to the pits with damaged fenders and flat tires. During the caution, the leaders made their final scheduled pit stops. Rusty Wallace's pit crew led by Buddy Parrott, executed a 15.9-second pit stop (considered lightning-fast at the time), and he came out of the pits with the lead. Jeff Gordon and Ernie Irvan came out second and third, respectively. The top five was rounded out by Brett Bodine and Bill Elliott. By that point in the race, Dale Earnhardt had worked all the way up to seventh place.

The green flag came back out with 26 laps to go. Rusty Wallace held the lead going into turn one, but Jeff Gordon passed him going down the backstretch. The two ran side by side in turn four, down the main stretch, and into turn one again. Gordon finally got by, with Irvan now up to second. Wallace's chances for victory were dashed, and he slipped all the way back to 7th.

Finish

With twenty laps to go, Ernie Irvan led Jeff Gordon and Brett Bodine. Gordon was battling a loose condition and decided to tuck in behind Irvan to improve his handling. As the laps dwindled down, Irvan and Gordon raced nose-to-tail and began to pull away from the rest of the field. Gordon slipped by to re-take the lead on lap 145, but Irvan stayed within reach. On lap 149, Irvan attempted to pass Gordon for the lead on the backstretch. Gordon stayed high in turn three, and the two went side-by-side into the turn. Exiting turn four, Gordon held off the challenge. One lap later, exiting turn two, Irvan tried the same move. This time the pass stuck, and Irvan was back in front.

With ten laps to go, Gordon tucked into second place and allowed Irvan to lead. Gordon's crew was instructing him to wait until the final 2–3 laps to make another pass attempt for the win.

With five laps to go, Ernie Irvan apparently ran over a piece of debris down the main stretch. He slid high going into turn one, and Jeff Gordon immediately dove underneath to take the lead. Coming out of turn two, and down the backstretch, Irvan's car looked unsettled. The right front tire blew, and he was forced to the pits. Gordon pulled away with Brett Bodine now in second. In the final four laps, Gordon was cheered on by the hometown crowd, but Bodine was beginning to close the gap. Gordon held off challenge and won the Inaugural Brickyard 400, his second career NASCAR Winston Cup victory. ABC Sports announcers Bob Jenkins and Benny Parsons described the finish thus:
Jenkins: Years from today when 79 (the number of Indianapolis 500s run prior to this event) stock car races have been run here, we'll remember the name Jeff Gordon, winner of the inaugural Brickyard 400!Parsons: Man, oh man, oh MAN!Jenkins: Jeff is screaming on his radio back to the pit crew, "Oh my God, I did it! I did it!"

After dropping to the last place early on, Dale Earnhardt charged all the way to a fifth-place finish. A dejected Ernie Irvan wound up a lap down in 17th place. Two weeks later, Irvan was involved in a serious crash at Michigan International Speedway where he suffered a near-fatal head injury. Brett Bodine's second place with King Racing would be the final top-five finish of his career. It was also the best finish for car owner Kenny Bernstein at the Speedway. Bodine's second place came six days after Scott Goodyear had delivered King Racing their first Indycar victory at Michigan.

Box score

Race results

(R) – denotes 1994 NASCAR Winston Cup Series rookie contender
(WW) – denotes NASCAR Winston West competitor

Race statistics
Time of race – 3:01:51
Average speed – 
Margin of victory – 0.53 seconds
Lead changes – 21 amongst 13 drivers
Total purse: $3,213,849 (winner's share $613,000)

Selected awards

Busch Pole Award: Rick Mast
Busch Beer Fastest Second Round Qualifier: Terry Labonte
Goody's Headache Award: Geoff Bodine
AP Parts Meet the Challenge Award: Lake Speed (+26 positions)
True Value Hard Charger Award: Jeff Gordon
Plasti-kote Winning Finish Award: Ray Evernham
Western Auto Mechanic of the Race: Ray Evernham
Unocal 76 Challenge: $15,200 available to polesitter Rick Mast – not won (rollover)

Sources:  

Championship standings following the 1994 Brickyard 400
Dale Earnhardt, 2,883
Ernie Irvan, −27
Rusty Wallace, −268
Mark Martin, −344
Ken Schrader, −355

Broadcasting
The 1994 Brickyard 400 was carried live on television by ABC Sports. Paul Page, who was the announcer on ABC's Indianapolis 500 broadcasts, served as host, with ABC/ESPN's regular NASCAR announcer Bob Jenkins handling the play-by-play duties. His fellow commentator on ESPN NASCAR broadcasts, Benny Parsons, served as color commentator. The pit reporters included Gary Gerould, Jerry Punch, and Jack Arute. ESPN carried practice and qualifying with the same crew. Ned Jarrett joined the booth crew for practice/qualifying only but did not work in the television booth on race day (he had a contract at the time with CBS).

The race was carried live on the radio by the IMS Radio Network. The broadcast was carried by over 450 affiliates in the United States. Mike Joy served as the play-by-play, with Ned Jarrett as an analyst. The turn reporters were Jerry Baker, Gary Lee, Larry Henry, and Bob Lamey. The pit reporters were Glenn Jarrett, Dave Despain, John Kernan, and Chris McClure. Howdy Bell served as a statistician. Chris Economaki sat in as a booth analyst during the pre-race, then as a roving reporter conducting interviews, and covering the garage area and hospital during the race. USAC historian Donald Davidson and author Greg Fielden were guests in the pre-race coverage, offering historical commentary. During the race itself, Davidson worked as a spotter for Bob Lamey on the radio. Davidson reprised his popular program The Talk of Gasoline Alley on WIBC for the week leading up to the event. Buddy Baker served as the driver analyst during qualifying coverage on Thursday and Friday (as Jarrett had commitments with ESPN). On race day, Baker was not part of the crew but visited the booth for a brief interview.

The Speedway public address announcing team from the Indy 500 was retained for the Brickyard 400. The chief announcer Tom Carnegie was joined by Jim Phillippe and David Calabro, but John Totten did not participate.

References

Brickyard 400
Brickyard 400
Brickyard 400
NASCAR races at Indianapolis Motor Speedway
1990s in Indianapolis
1994 in American motorsport
Brickyard 400
1994 in motorsport